The Sacramento Police Department (SPD) is the police department for the city of Sacramento, California. On August 11, 2017, Daniel Hahn was sworn in and became the city's first African American police chief.

History
The founding of the City of Sacramento was a turbulent one - a beginning when life was cheap, the stakes were high and a large percentage of the population acted with the philosophy "it was every man for himself in his own backyard."

By 1849, Sacramento had grown rapidly from a small settlement at Sutter's Fort to a town of 10,000 people. The discovery of gold had brought people from all walks of life together. Sacramento had all the problems of a Wild West town. There were murders, robberies, shootings, and various other crimes committed in the city. In the summer of 1849, the city experienced its first lynching when a gambler named Roe was convicted by a citizens' committee and hanged for murder. On August 1, 1849, the City of Sacramento was founded when the first meeting of a Common Council was held. At that time, the City boundaries were north to the American river, east to 31st Street, south to Y Street and west to the Sacramento River, encompassing 4.5 square miles. N. C. Cunningham was appointed as the first City Marshall (the position now known as Chief of Police) and was given two deputies to enforce the law.

The city did not have a building for a police station or jail, so in May 1850, the ship, LaGrange, was moored at the foot of H Street on the river and officially became the police station and jail boat.

As a result of the Gold Rush in 1852, Sacramento had grown in size until the population had reached 150,000 persons. The Police Department was also increased to six men. In addition to normal police duties, these six officers had to deal with the first Chinese Tong War to ever occur outside of China. Also, the most ambitious murder plot ever recorded in the West occurred during this period. Three men, one of them the Public Administrator, plotted to kill 55 leading wealthy Sacramentans for their money. The Police Department identified the murderers and arrested two of them after the first killing. Both men were subsequently convicted and hanged for their crime.

The Police Department grew slowly from 1849 to 1913 when it had 36 officers. The men of the Department patrolled the city on foot and on bicycles. The Department had two bicycles at that time. A typical bicycle beat covered about one half of the entire city, or about 200 square blocks. In those years, the Department did not have radio equipment. Communication between the Police Station and the beat officers was accomplished by telephones located in specially designated "call boxes" distributed throughout the city for this purpose.

Modern police history, as we now know it, began in 1917. The city's population had declined to just 90,000 people after the Gold Rush boom, but the Department now totaled 100 men. During this period, the Department moved into the new Hall of Justice building at 6th and I Streets.

During the Great Recession, the department's budget decreased by 30%, causing it to lay off 300 officers.

In 2016, two officers tried to run over and then fatally shot Joseph Mann, an African American man armed with a knife who was about 27 feet away. In 2017, the Sacramento County District Attorney cleared the two officers of any legal wrongdoing, concluding that they were justified in shooting Mann, but after an internal investigation by the Sacramento Police Department, neither Tennis nor Lozoya remain on the force.

In April 2017, a video of a Sacramento officer beating a jaywalker prompted a criminal investigation.

On March 18 2018, two Sacramento officers shot and killed Stephon Clark. During protests following the news that the officers would not be charged, Sacramento Police arrested 80 people, including a journalist. One woman was injured by a police vehicle.

Organization

Office of the Chief

 Intergovernmental & Legislative Affairs
 Internal Affairs Division & Professional Standards Unit
 Media & Public Relations Unit

Office of Operations

Patrol Division
The city of Sacramento is divided into six patrol districts with each district divided into beats. District Three has 2 Beats and District six has 5 beats with Districts One,Two,Four and Five having 3 beats  . Listed below are the Districts and the neighborhoods they include.

District One (Northwest)
 Beat A - North Natomas
 Beat B - South Natomas
 Beat C - Northgate

District Two (Northeast)
 Beat A - Robla/Del Paso Heights
 Beat B - Hagginwood
 Beat C - Arden/Old North Sac

District Three (Central)
 Beat A - Downtown
 Beat B - Midtown

District Four (Southwest)
 Beat A - Land Park
 Beat B - Sac Executive
 Beat C - Pocket

District Five (South)
 Beat A - Meadowview
 Beat B - Parkway
 Beat C - Valley Hi/North Laguna

District Six (East)
 Beat A - Oak Park
 Beat B - Tahoe Park/Tallac Village
 Beat C - South East/Glen Elder/Fruitridge
 Beat D - Fab 40's
 Beat E - College Town

Metro Division
The Metro Division provides specialized resources citywide to both the Patrol Division and the Office of Investigations. Commanded by a captain, Metro is divided into three operational sections, each led by a police lieutenant, as well as an administrative support team.

Metro administration
 Hostage Negotiations Team (HNT)
 Licensing and Permits

Regional Transit Police Services Section
 Mission and Information
 Juvenile Intervention 
 Patrol Services 
 Transit Crime Response Team (TCRT)

Special Operations Section
 Alarm Operations Unit
 Canine Unit
 Parole Intervention Team (PIT)
 Reserve Officers/Special Events/Supplemental Employment Unit
 Special Weapons and Tactics (SWAT) Teams (2)

Traffic / Air Operations Section
 Air Support Unit
 Alcoholic Beverage Liaison & Compliance
 Court Liaison Unit
 Crime Prevention Through Environmental Design (CPTED) Unit
 Major Collisions Investigations Unit
 Traffic Unit (2 Enforcement, 1 POP)

Office of Investigations

Office of Public Safety Information Technology

Office of Emergency Services and Homeland Security

Facilities

Police Headquarters (Public Safety Center)

William J Kinney Police Facility (North Station)

300 Richards Facility (Central Station)

Joseph E Rooney Police Facility (South Station)

Communications Center

This 28,000 sq. ft. state of the art facility serves as the primary answering point for emergency calls in the City of Sacramento. The Communications Division work groups are responsible for the answering, processing, and dispatching of emergency (911) and non-emergency phone calls. Ancillary duties include running a dispatch training & academy curriculum. The Communications Division holds the Peace Officer Standards and Training (P.O.S.T.) certificates for training in the Sacramento region for the Dispatcher Basic Course as well as the Communications Training Officer Course.

Police Academy/In-Service Training Facility (McClellan Park)
The Sacramento Police Department offers a variety of resources "to assist the community in staying safe and informed." The following offer valuable information in a variety of areas.

 Cops & Clergy
 Crime Victim Resources
 Domestic Violence
 Drive Safe Sacramento
 Emergency Services
 Entertainment and Nightlife
 Fee Schedule
 Homeland Security
 IMPACT Team
 LGBT Liaison
 Off-Highway Motor Vehicle Recreation
 Sacramento Police Cares
 Safety and Crime Prevention Tips
 Start Smart Teen Driving Class
 Suspect Description Form"

Personnel killed in the line of duty
Since the establishment of the Sacramento Police Department, 18 officers have been recognized as deaths in the line of duty.

Chief of Police Erskine G. Fish was remembered by the radio series Dragnet, in the end of the 9th episode, which aired on August 4, 1949.

, there have been 16 deaths in total. Most fallen officers were lost due to gunfire, 11 officers died in gunfire, 1 officer died in an accidental gun firing.1 officer died of a heart attack,  2 officers died of a motorcycle accident, 1 officer died in a vehicular assault, and 2 officers died in a vehicular pursuit.

See also

 List of law enforcement agencies in California
 Sacramento County Sheriff's Department
 2022 Sacramento shooting

References

External links
 Official website
 Sacramento Police Department K9 Association

Police Department
Municipal police departments of California